is a former Japanese football player. He played for Japan national team.

Club career
Mochizuki was born in Otsu on May 18, 1964. After graduating from Osaka University of Commerce, he joined Nippon Kokan (later NKK SC) in 1987. The club won the 2nd place at 1987–88 Japan Soccer League and the champions at 1987 JSL Cup. In 1992, he moved to J1 League club Urawa Reds. In 1995, he moved to Japan Football League club Kyoto Purple Sanga. In 1995, the club won the 2nd place and was promoted to J1 League. He retired in 1996.

National team career
On January 27, 1988, Mochizuki debuted for Japan national team against United Arab Emirates. He also played at 1990 World Cup qualification in 1989. He played 7 games for Japan until 1989.

Club statistics

National team statistics

References

External links

Japan National Football Team Database

1964 births
Living people
Osaka University of Commerce alumni
Association football people from Shiga Prefecture
Japanese footballers
Japan international footballers
Japan Soccer League players
J1 League players
Japan Football League (1992–1998) players
NKK SC players
Urawa Red Diamonds players
Kyoto Sanga FC players
Association football midfielders
Association football forwards
Academic staff of Biwako Seikei Sport College